The UZGA LMS-901 Baikal is a utility aircraft produced by UZGA (Ural Works of Civil Aviation).

The Russian Ministry of Industry and Trade selected UZGA in October 2019 to develop a replacement for the widespread Antonov An-2.
The prototype made its maiden flight on 30 January 2022.

The aluminum, single-turboprop airplane is powered by a GE H80 or a Klimov VK-800.

Development 

In October 2019, UZGA (Ural Works of Civil Aviation) subsidiary Baikal Engineering won a tender to develop a light multi-purpose aircraft for the Russian Ministry of Industry and Trade.
The first prototype was planned for the end of 2020, to begin testing in mid-2021; certification was planned for 2022 and mass production to start in 2023, while demand was expected for 230 planes.

The LMS-901 is designed to replace the Antonov An-2 after the SibNIA TVS-2DTS was indefinitely delayed.
Wind tunnel testing was completed in late November 2020, as Russian regional airlines were interested in 200 aircraft.

By April 2021, an LMS-901 prototype airframe was completed.
Serial production at Komsomolsk-on-Amur of 30 to 50 units per year was then planned for 2024.

By August 2022, it had been ordered by siberian operators KrasAir and Aeroservis, with seven too be delivered to the later between 2025 and 2028, powered by a Klimov VK-800SM turboprop.
In January 2023, Russian Aerokhimflot, an association of forestry and agricultural aviation operators set up in 2019, agreed to acquire 120 LMS-901s between 2026 and 2030.

Design 

The aluminum-made, high-wing monoplane is to be powered by the General Electric H80-200 and seat 9 passengers.
Smaller and almost two times lighter than the An-2, it should cost less than 120 million rubles ($1.6 million).
The project cost is estimated at 4.5 billion rubles ($ M) and the operating costs (excluding ownership) at 30,000 rubles ($) per flying hour.

It should reach 300 km/h from a 95 km/h landing speed and cover 3,000 km.
Optional electric motors could offer redundancy.
It should fly a 800 nmi (1,500 km) range with a  payload from short unpaved airstrips.

Specifications

See also

References

2020s Russian aircraft
Aircraft first flown in 2022